
Maków County is a unit of territorial administration and local government (powiat) in Masovian Voivodeship, east-central Poland. It came into being on January 1, 1999, as a result of the Polish local government reforms passed in 1998.

As of 2019 its total population is 45,076, out of which the population of Maków Mazowiecki is 9,776, that of Różan is 2,709, and the rural population is 32,591.

Neighbouring counties
Maków County is bordered by Ostrołęka County to the north-east, Wyszków County to the south-east, Pułtusk County to the south, Ciechanów County to the west and Przasnysz County to the north-west.

Administrative division
The county is subdivided into 10 gminas (one urban, one urban-rural and eight rural). These are listed in the following table, in descending order of population.

References

 
Land counties of Masovian Voivodeship